Binz railway station may refer to:

 Ostseebad Binz railway station,  in the town of Binz, Mecklenburg-Vorpommern, Germany
 Zürich Binz railway station, in the city of Zürich, Switzerland